The New Brunswick Liberal Association held a leadership convention on August 6, 2022, in Fredericton, New Brunswick, as a result of Kevin Vickers' announcement on September 14, 2020, that he was resigning as party leader. Vickers resignation followed the outcome of the 2020 New Brunswick general election which saw the Progressive Conservative party, under Blaine Higgs, form a majority government and the Liberal Party lose three seats. The deadline for candidates to file their intention to run for the leadership was June 15, 2022. Voting by party members for the leadership occurred at a free in-person convention as well as remotely via phone and internet connected device and used a ranked ballot system.

Susan Holt was elected leader on the third ballot.

Candidates

Qualified

Donald Arseneault

Donald Arseneault was the MLA for Campbellton-Dalhousie (2014–2017) and for Dalhousie-Restigouche East (2003–2014). He served as Minister of Post-Secondary Education, Training and Labour (2008–2010, 2016–2017), Minister of Intergovernmental Affairs (2016–2017), Minister of Energy and Mines (2014–2016), Deputy Premier (2010), and Minister of Natural Resources (2006–2008).

Candidacy announced: October 28, 2021
Campaign website:

Robert Gauvin

Robert Gauvin is the MLA for Shediac Bay-Dieppe (2020–present) and was previously the MLA for Shippagan-Lamèque-Miscou (2018–2020). Elected in 2018 as a Progressive Conservative, he served in the Higgs government as Deputy Premier (2018–2020), Minister of Tourism, Heritage and Culture, and Minister responsible for La Francophonie (2018–2020) before resigning from cabinet and the PC caucus in February 2020 in protest of the government's health reforms.

Candidacy announced: January 30, 2022
Campaign website:

T. J. Harvey
T. J. Harvey was the MP for Tobique—Mactaquac (2015–2019).

Candidacy announced: June 19, 2021
Campaign website:

Susan Holt
Susan Holt is a Fredericton tech executive, the former President of the New Brunswick Business Council, and a former advisor to Premier Brian Gallant. In 2018, Holt ran for the Liberals in Fredericton South, losing to Green leader David Coon. Holt is the first woman to ever run for the New Brunswick Liberal leadership.

Candidacy announced: February 14, 2022
Campaign website:

Withdrew or failed to qualify

Seamus Byrne
Seamus Byrne is a Saint John businessperson. Byrne failed to meet the May 2 deadline to pay the $30,000 entrance fee and submit the required 50 signatures of Liberal members willing to support him and was disqualified from the race. Though he initially fought the ruling, claiming that the requirements were anti-democratic, and on May 17 was given a two-day extension to submit the entrance fee and signatures,  he suspended his campaign on May 20 after discovering another problem with his entrance application.

Candidacy announced: December 17, 2021
Candidacy suspended: May 20, 2022
Campaign website:

Declined
Roger Melanson (Interim leader, MLA for Dieppe)

Results
Results are in percentage of points with 100 points allotted to each of 49 ridings, with a total of 4,900 points available in the election. A preferential ballot was used.

First Ballot
T. J. Harvey 33.9% 
Susan Holt 32.12%
Robert Gauvin 19.76%
Donald Arseneault 14.22%
Aresenault eliminated
Second Ballot
T. J. Harvey 39.58%
Susan Holt 36.76% 
Robert Gauvin 23.67%
Gauvin eliminated

Third Ballot
Susan Holt 51.67%
T. J. Harvey 48.33%
Holt elected

References

2022 elections in Canada
New Brunswick Liberal Association Leadership elections
2022 in New Brunswick
New Brunswick Liberal Association leadership election